Ritviz Srivastava (born 24 July 1996) is an Indian singer-songwriter, electronic musician and record producer from Pune, Maharashtra, India. He is known for his song "Udd Gaye" featured on A.I.B.'s official YouTube channel after becoming the winner of the 2017 Bacardi House Party Sessions, a talent hunt competition organized by A.I.B. and Nucleya. Ritviz has been selected for the Forbes India 30 Under 30 list of 2021, and has been featured on one of the digital covers of the Grazia India Cool List 2021.

Early life and career 
Ritviz Srivastava was born in Darbhanga, Bihar and brought up in Pune, Maharashtra. He currently resides in Goa. His mother, Mrs Anvita Bharti, is the Head of the Department of Performing Arts at Delhi Public School, Pune, Maharashtra. His father, Mr Pranay Prasoon, is a banker in the department of Foreign Exchange at ICICI Bank in Pune and also plays the tabla. This resulted in an exposure to music from an early age. Ritviz started learning music when he was 8 years old, and went on to be tutored by Uday Bhawalkar in the Dhrupad subgenre of Hindustani Music. He composed his first song at the age of 11. His preferred D.A.W. is Ableton.

Ritviz has released four EPs, "Yuv", "Ved", "Dev" and "Baaraat"; and his debut album, "Mimmi". His songs "Liggi" and "Udd Gaye" have been especially successful, their music videos having gathered, as of 12 September 2022, 166 million and 97 million (video and audio combined) views on YouTube respectively.

His associated acts include a remix of Nucleya's track "Lights", from the 2016 album "Raja Baja", a remix of Major Lazer's "Light It Up", of which Ritviz made the Diwali version which features his voice as well as production, and lastly a remix of Lauv's "Modern Loneliness". Ritviz has performed at EDC Las Vegas, Sunburn Festival, the Bacardi NH7 Weekender, Zomaland by Zomato and YouTube Fanfest. He opened for Katy Perry and Dua Lipa at the OnePlus Music Festival.

Ritviz composed the title track of the Amazon Prime Video show Comicstaan, appeared on the soundtrack of the Netflix series Mismatched with "Sun Toh", and his music has been featured in the Marvel series Ms. Marvel.

Teasers 
In 2018, at the "Redbull Off the Roof" event in Mumbai, DIVINE performed a rap verse on the beat of "Ved" by Ritviz. This version remains unreleased.

On an Instagram Live in April 2020, Ritviz played a remix of "Chehra" by Hanita Bhambri and "Jeet 2.0". A few days later, on Tanmay Bhat's "Stay Home for India - Day 2" YouTube live-stream, on a Zoom call with Ritviz and Kaneez Surka, Tanmay played two of Ritviz's unreleased songs, "Oas Hai" and "Naina". "Oas Hai" has a feature on the song by the rap duo Seedhe Maut, while the latter was “Naina” ("Panchi"), a track which has a feature from the rapper DIVINE, co-produced by Nucleya. He has teased songs on his Instagram lives with tracks featuring artists Nucleya, Anish Sood and Karan Kanchan. In July 2020, in the promotional video for his virtual event with Nucleya and Anish Sood, "retroFUTURE", Ritviz played an unreleased song called "Dev". His tracks "Sargam", "Parchayi" and "Meet" (with Nucleya) remain unreleased as well.

On World Music Day 2021, Ritviz announced two new albums consisting of 21 songs, collaborated with Nucleya and Seedhe Maut on Tanmay Bhat's Instagram Live.

Discography

Albums and EPs

Singles and collaborations

Web series soundtracks

References

External links
 

Date of birth uncertain
Living people
Musicians from Pune
1996 births